God in Disguise (sometimes translated to English as A God Disguised or Disguised God), Op. 24, is a cantata (officially "lyrical suite") for narrator, soprano, baritone, mixed choir, and orchestra written in 1940 by Swedish composer Lars-Erik Larsson. Tuneful and pastoral in style, the neoromantic God in Disguise is a setting of a 1933 narrative poem by the Swedish poet Hjalmar Gullberg; Gullberg's poem is itself based on the prologue to a Hellenic play, in which the god Apollo is exiled from Olympus and condemned to mortal servitude as a flute-playing Thessalian shepherd. The cantata, which premiered over Swedish Radio on 1 April 1940 under the composer's baton, was an instant success. It remains not only one of Larsson's most celebrated compositions, but also one of the most frequently performed pieces of Swedish art music.

Background
Beginning in 1937, the Swedish Broadcasting Corporation—the country's national, publicly-funded radio—employed Larsson as a composer-in-residence, music producer, and conductor; his main task was to write music to accompany various radio programs. One of Larsson's colleagues was the Swedish poet Hjalmar Gullberg, who had joined Swedish Radio the year before and headed its drama division. Together, the two men developed a genre of popular entertainment they called the "lyrical suite", which alternated recited poetry with musical interludes. One such radio program was the Times of Day, which included poems by—among others—Verner von Heidenstam and Oscar Levertin; Larsson subsequently excerpted his original music as the Pastoral Suite (Op. 19, 1937–1938). 

To build on this success, Gullberg approached Larsson at a Christmas party in 1938 about the possibility of expanding the lyrical suite to include parts for vocal soloists and chorus—that is, to be transform it into a quasi-cantata; he suggested the composer set God in Disguise, a narrative poem from his 1933 anthology . Gullberg's poem was itself a retelling of the prologue to a Hellenic play by Euripides, while also incorporating elements from the stories of Orpheus and Jesus. In it, Apollo—the Greek god of poetry—has been exiled from Olympus and condemned to live as a mortal for one year. "Wear[ing] no wreath around his golden hair", he settles in Thessaly, "disguised ... among the serving-folk" as a flute-playing "goodly" shepherd who "bears his burden on earth ... without complaint".  

Gullberg's poem fired Larsson's imagination. "I instantly became deeply fascinated by the task," the composer recalled, "and together [Gullberg and I] planned the disposition of the different parts for soloists, chorus, and recitant ... It was not until the spring of 1940, however, that I felt the subject had matured sufficiently within me for the composition to begin". By then, the Nazi occupation of Denmark and invasion of Norway during World War II had begun, and Gullberg asked Larsson if he could add to his text a new forward in support of Sweden's threatened Nordic neighbors:

God in Disguise is thus a "protest against violence" that "inspired in listeners a sense of calm and confidence during dark times and instilled in them the firm hope that truth and right would eventually prevail", or as the seventh poem states:

God in Disguise dates to a transitional period in Larsson's art, in which he began evolving his established neoclassical style with an emerging neoromanticism.

Structure

God in Disguise, which lasts about 30 minutes, comprises ten sections:
 Prelude: Andante tranquillo [Orchestra]
 Recitation: 
  (Forward).  ... (Not for the strong in the world but for the feeble ...)
 I.  ... (Who plays upon a pipe ...)
 No. 2: Allegro moderato [Chorus and orchestra]
 Recitation: 
 II.  ... (Apollo stays in a Thessalian steading ...)
 III.  ... (Around the fire in autumn ...)
 IV.  ... (Well-being will follow / the path of a god ...)
 No. 3: Agitato [Baritone, chorus, and orchestra]
 No. 4: Alla marcia [Chorus and orchestra]
 Recitation: 
 V.  ... (So let us praise this husbandman ...)
 VI.  ... (What shimmers in the forest ...)
 No. 5: Andantino quasi allegretto [Soprano, chorus, and orchestra]
 Recitation: 
 VII.  ... (So gods are wandering yet upon the earth ...)
 VIII.  ... (Think you that sheep would / ever graze in the glowing morn ...)
 IX.  ... (When with a beck'ning glance ...)
 No. 6: Andante—Andante molto tranquillo [Soprano, baritone, chorus, and orchestra]

Instrumentation
God in Disguise is scored for narrator, soprano, baritone, mixed choir (sopranos, altos, tenors, and baritones), and orchestra. The orchestra includes the following instruments:

Woodwinds: 2 flutes, 2 oboes, 2 clarinets (in B), and 2 bassoons
Brass: 2 horns (in F), 2 trumpets (in C), and trombone
Percussion: timpani
Strings: violins, violas, cellos, double basses, and harp

 published the cantata in 1946.

Recordings
The sortable table below lists commercially available recordings of God in Disguise:

Notes, references, and sources

 

 

 

 

Compositions by Lars-Erik Larsson
20th-century classical music
Classical music in Sweden
1940 compositions
Compositions with a narrator
Orchestral suites